Adrian Billhardt (born 17 October 1997) is a German professional footballer who plays as a midfielder for Detroit City in the USL Championship.

Career

Youth
Billhardt spent the majority of his youth career with BFC Dynamo and Union Berlin in his native Germany.

BFC Dynamo
In 2016, Billhardt re-joined Regionalliga club BFC Dynamo, with whom he'd spent several years of his youth career. He made his senior debut for the club on 31 July 2016, coming on as an 86th-minute substitute for Zlatko Muhović in a 5–0 victory over Union Fürstenwalde. He would go on to make eight league appearances for the club, all during the 2016–17 season, before committing to play at the University of South Florida.

College
Billhardt played for three seasons at the University of South Florida, with his senior season being interrupted by the COVID-19 pandemic. He made his debut against Lipscomb in August 2017, tallying an assist in a 3–0 victory. Just days later, he scored the first goal of his collegiate career in a 3–2 defeat to Butler. Following his freshman season, in which he tallied five goals in 15 appearances, he was named First Team All-Conference in the American Athletic Conference. As a junior, Billhardt was named Second Team All-Conference, after scoring four times in 18 appearances. Billhardt ended his college career with 46 appearances, scoring nine goals and registering 10 assists.

During the summer of 2019, Billhardt played the USL League Two season with Tormenta FC 2. He made a total of 15 appearances between the regular season and playoffs, scoring nine goals as the club won the Deep South Division.

Tormenta FC
In February 2021, Billhardt signed his first professional contract with Tormenta FC of USL League One. He made his debut for the club on 17 April 2021 against Fort Lauderdale CF.

Detroit City FC
On 19 January 2023, Billhardt signed with USL Championship club Detroit City on a contract for the 2023 USL Championship season with and option for 2024.

References

External links
Adrian Billhardt at Sofa Score

1997 births
Living people
German footballers
Association football midfielders
Berliner FC Dynamo players
South Florida Bulls men's soccer players
Tormenta FC players
Detroit City FC players
Regionalliga players
USL League Two players
USL League One players
German expatriate footballers
German expatriate sportspeople in the United States
Expatriate soccer players in the United States
Footballers from Berlin